is a city located in Kagoshima Prefecture, Japan. The city was founded on April 1, 1954. As of 2017, the city has an estimated population of 52,978. In 2008, the city had a population density of 170 persons per km². The total area is 329.98 km².

On March 13, 2006, the towns of Noda and Takaono (both from Izumi District) were merged into Izumi.

Izumi City lies at the northwestern corner of Kagoshima Prefecture. It borders Kumamoto Prefecture. Izumi as indicated by its kanji, is the point at which the Komenotsu River flows into the sea. It is famed for its some ten thousand cranes that migrate from Siberia every year to winter in the mild climes of southern Japan at the Izumi crane migration grounds.

The Kyushu Shinkansen stops at Izumi Station.

High Schools in Izumi 
 Izumi Chuo High School
Izumi Industrial High School
Izumi Municipal Commercial High School
Izumi Senior High School

Notable people
 Nanami Sakuraba, gravure idol and actress
 Keisuke Osako, Football player

References

External links
  
 

Cities in Kagoshima Prefecture